2PM of 2PM is the fourth Japanese studio album (eighth-overall) by South Korean boy band 2PM. It was released on April 15, 2015, as their second album release under Sony Music Japan sublabel Epic Records Japan in three editions: 

 Regular edition: CD
 Limited edition A: CD + DVD 
 Limited edition B: CD + CD

There are 13 new tracks in this fourth Japanese studio album. Tracks from Guilty Love are also included on this album.

The album debuted at number one on the Weekly Oricon Albums Chart.

On May 20, 2015 2PM released a repackaged edition to "2PM of 2PM" with two editions:

 Regular edition: CD + new song "I know"
 Limited edition A: CD + DVD

Track listing

Release history

Oricon charts

References

External links
 Japanese Official Website

2015 albums
2PM albums
Japanese-language albums
Epic Records albums
Sony Music Entertainment Japan albums